Saritha is an Indian actress who has acted in more than 500 films in Tamil, Malayalam, Kannada and Telugu languages. She was one of the popular and critically acclaimed lead actresses during the 1980s. She also appeared in a television serial, Selvi. She is also credited as a dubbing artist. She has dubbed her voice for Tamil, Kannada, Malayalam and Telugu movies for actresses like Nagma, Vijayashanti, Tabu, Sushmita Sen, Ramya Krishnan and Soundarya in 1990s.

She is a recipient of several state awards from Tamil, Telugu and Kannada, six Filmfare Awards and six Nandi Awards including a Special Jury Award for the film Arjun. Saritha received Tamil Nadu State Film Awards four times, Karnataka State Film Awards once and many Film fans association award.

Career
Saritha made her acting debut through Manchiki Sthanam Ledu a movie produced by producer based in Warangal in 1978 with a different screen name followed by Maro Charitra, a Telugu film directed by K. Balachander. The movie dealt with cross-cultural romance, where she acted opposite Kamal Haasan as a Telugu-speaking girl. She received more offers in Tamil films and Tamil Audience accepted herself as her own,she mostly acted films directed by Balachander. Some of her films are Thappu Thalangal, Idi Katha Kaadu, Vandichakkaram, Netrikan, Agni Sakshi, Puthukavithai, Kalyana Agathigal and Achamillai Achamillai. Her performance in Vandichakkaram (1980) and Achamillai Achamillai (1984) won her the Filmfare Best Tamil Actress awards. She also played guest roles as herself in 47 Natkal and its Telugu remake, directed by Balachander.

She acted in many popular Kannada movies with famous Kannada actor Dr. Rajkumar like Hosa Belaku, Keralida Simha, Bhakta Prahlada, Chalisuva Modagalu and Kaamana Billu. Her other popular Kannada movies include Eradu Rekhegalu, Sankranthi and Malaya Marutha.

She had her head tonsured for the cancer-affected role in Sujatha in 1980 and gained several pounds to play the psychotic role in the 2005 film Julie Ganapathi. Neither of these films were successful but won Critical acclaim. She also won a Nandi Special Jury Award for her performance as "Aandaalu" in the movie Arjun in 2004.

Saritha also worked as a voice actor in Kannada, Telugu and Tamil films. She has lent her voice to other actresses, including Madhavi, Soundarya, Ramya Krishnan, Nagma, Vijayashanti, Simran, Tabu, Sushmita Sen, Roja, Suhasini, Radha, Radhika and Aarthi Agarwal. She won four times the Nandi Award for Best Female Dubbing Artist for her voice to Soundarya in Ammoru, Maa Ayana Bangaram (1997) and  Anthapuram (1999).

Personal life
Saritha was born and brought up as Abhilasha in Munipalle, Guntur District, Andhra Pradesh, India. 

She married Malayalam actor Mukesh on 2 September 1988 and they have two sons, Shravan and Tejas. The couple separated in 2011. Saritha now resides with Shravan (made his acting debut in the 2018 film Kalyanam) in Al Ain, UAE.

Awards

Filmfare Awards South
 1980 – Best Actress – Tamil - Vandichakkaram 1982 – Best Actress – Kannada - Hosa Belaku 1984 – Best Actress – Tamil - Achamillai Achamillai 1985 – Best Actress – Kannada - Mugila Mallige 1986 – Best Actress – Kannada - Mouna Geethe 1989 – Best Actress – Kannada - SankranthiNandi Awards
 1982 – Special Jury – Best Actress - Kokilamma 1995 – Best Female Dubbing Artist - Ammoru 1996 – Best Female Dubbing Artist - Maavichiguru 1997 – Best Female Dubbing Artist - Maa Ayana Bangaram 1998 – Best Female Dubbing Artist - Anthapuram 2004 – Special Jury - ArjunTamil Nadu State Film Awards
 Kalaimamani Award from Tamil Nadu State
 1979 – Best Actress - Oru Vellaadu Vengaiyagiradhu 1982 – Best Actress - Agni Sakshi 1988 – Best Actress - Poo Pootha Nandavanam 1995 – Best Female Dubbing Artist – Amman (1995)

Karnataka State Film Awards
 1989 – Best Actress - SankranthiFilmography

Tamil films

Malayalam films

 Oru Kochu Kadha Aarum Parayatha Kadha (1984) as Janu
 Sandarbham (1984) as Dr.Indhu
 Minimol Vathikkaanil  (1984) as Susie
 Kaathodu Kaathoram (1985) as Marykutty
 Muhoortham 11:30 (1985) as Indu
 Kaattuthee (1985)
 Oru Kochu Kaaryam (1985)
 Kanikaanumneram (1987) as Savithri
 Yaagaagni (1987) as Bhairavi
 P.C. 369 (1987) as Elsa Mathew
 Manasa Maine Varu (1987) as Lakshmi
 Thaniyavarthanam (1987) as Indu Balan
 Vilambaram (1987) as Sunanda
 Sangham (1988) ... Ammini
 Onnum Onnum Pathinonnu  (1988) as Sumi
 Anuragi (1989) as Rosamma
 Lal Americayil (1989) as Sindhu
 Kuttettan (1990) as Seetha Lakshmi
 Souhrudam (1991) as Annie
 Life Is Beautiful (2000) as Vice Principal
 Ammakilikkoodu (2003) as Janaki
 ChakravaalamKannada films

Telugu films

 Maro Charitra (1978) as Swapna
 Manchiki Sthanam Ledu (1979)
 Idi Katha Kaadu (1979) as Gayathri
 Guppedu Manasu (1979) as Baby
 Vijaya (1979) as Vijaya
 Tholi Kodi Koosindi (1980)
 Gutilo Ramachilaka (1980)
 Srirasthu Shubamasthu (1981)
 Athagari Pethanam (1981)
 47 Rojulu (1981)
 Rama Dandu (1981)
 Aadavallu Meeku Joharulu (1981) as Papayamma
 Chandamama (1982)
 Kalahala Kapuram (1982)
 Kokilamma (1983) as Kokilamma
 Prema Sagaram (1983)
 Thodu Needa (1983) as Sharada
 Kanchana Ganga (1984) as Kanchana
 Bhagyalakshmi(1984)
 Kala Rudrudu (1985)
 Anuraga Bandham (1985)
 Kaliyuga Pandavulu (1986) as Krishnaveni
 Satyagraham (1987)
 Shivude Shankarudu (1988) as Dr. Kavitha
  Arjun '' (2004) as Andal

Television

As dubbing artist
Films

Television

References

External links
 

Living people
Indian film actresses
Indian voice actresses
Indian television actresses
Tamil Nadu State Film Awards winners
Filmfare Awards South winners
Actresses in Tamil cinema
Actresses in Malayalam cinema
Actresses in Kannada cinema
Actresses in Telugu cinema
20th-century Indian actresses
21st-century Indian actresses
Actresses from Andhra Pradesh
People from Guntur district
Actresses in Tamil television
Year of birth missing (living people)